The 2022 International Tour of Hellas was a road cycling stage race held between 27 April and 1 May 2022 in Greece. It was the 18th edition of the Tour of Greece. The race returned after a 10 year absence from the sport.

Teams 
One UCI WorldTeams, five UCI ProTeams, twelve UCI Continental and two National teams participated in the race.

UCI WorldTeams

 

UCI ProTeams

 
 
 
 
 

UCI Continental Teams

 Cross Team Legendre
 
 
 
 
 
 
 
 
 
 
 

National teams

 Cyprus
 Greece

Route 
The 2022 edition included five stages covering  over five days.

Stages

Stage 1 
27 April 2022 — Heraklion to Chania,

Stage 2 
28 April 2022 — Marousi to Itea, Phocis,

Stage 3 
29 April 2022 — Delphi to Karditsa,

Stage 4 
30 April 2022 — Karditsa to Larisa,

Stage 5 
1 May 2022 — Kalabaka to Ioannina,

Classification leadership table

Final standings

General classification

Points classification

Mountains classification

Young rider classification

Team classification

References 

International Tour of Hellas
International Tour of Hellas
April 2022 sports events in Greece
May 2022 sports events in Greece